Walter Rudolf Leistikow (1865–1908) was a German landscape painter, graphic artist, designer and art critic.

Biography 
His father was a pharmacist who owned a Kräuterlikör manufacturing plant in Kujawien that provided much of the family's income. In 1883, aged seventeen, he moved to Berlin to attend the Prussian Academy of Art, but after barely one year, he was dismissed by Anton von Werner for lack of talent. He then took private lessons from Hermann Eschke and Hans Gude from 1885 to 1887.

Leistikow's first exhibition was at the Berliner Salon in 1886 and, in 1892 he became a member of an artists' association known as Die-XI, which was opposed to the teaching methods at the Academy. From 1892 to 1895, he taught at the private academy, Akademie Fehr, run by artist Conrad Fehr and located on Lützowstrasse 82 in Berlin. He also designed furniture, carpets and wallpapers. In 1902, he was chosen to create trading cards for the Stollwerck chocolate company of Cologne and produced a series of German landscapes.

For a time, Leistikow tried to become a writer, publishing a novella called Seine Cousine (1893) in the Freie Bühne and a novel, Auf der Schwelle (1896), but they received little attention. To make matters worse, Kaiser Wilhelm II despised his pictures and was quoted as saying "er hat mir den ganzen Grunewald versaut" (he has ruined the entire Grunewald for me).

In 1894, he married Anna Mohr (1863–1950), a merchant's daughter from Copenhagen. In 1903, he was one of the co-founders of the Deutscher Künstlerbund.

By 1908, Leistikow was dying from the agonizing effects of advanced-stage syphilis. He committed suicide by shooting himself while staying at the Sanatorium Hubertus on the Schlachtensee. Shortly after, a street in Berlin's Westend district was named after him. In 1920, a street in the Mahlsdorf district was named after him as well. He was later given an ehrengrab at the cemetery in Steglitz. A commemorative stamp was issued in 1972, with one of his paintings of the  Schlachtensee.

Selected paintings

References

Further reading 
 Ernst Schur: Walter Leistikow. In: Berliner Architekturwelt, 11. Jahrgang, Nr. 6 (September 1908), pgs.213–215.
 Lovis Corinth: Das Leben Walter Leistikows. Ein Stück Berliner Kulturgeschichte. Paul Cassirer, Berlin 1910
 Margrit Bröhan: Walter Leistikow – Landschaftsbilder. Ars Nicolai, Berlin 1994 
 Markus Nass: Walter Leistikow. Das druckgraphische Werk. Galerie Gerda Bassenge, Berlin 1999,  
 Ingeborg Becker (Ed.): Stimmungslandschaften. Gemälde von Walter Leistikow. Exhibition catalog, Deutscher Kunstverlag, Berlin/München 2008,

External links 

 ArtNet: More works by Leistikow.
 
 
 Ausstellung Die Welt will Grunewald von mir. mit Bildliste (PDF; 448 kB) seit 19. Oktober 2012 im Bröhan-Museum, Berlin

1865 births
1908 deaths
Artists from Bydgoszcz
19th-century German painters
19th-century German male artists
German male painters
20th-century German painters
20th-century German male artists
People from the Province of Posen
German landscape painters
Artists who committed suicide
1908 suicides